Madison Square Garden, colloquially known as The Garden or by its initials MSG, is a multi-purpose indoor arena in New York City. It is located in Midtown Manhattan between Seventh and Eighth avenues from 31st to 33rd Street, above Pennsylvania Station. It is the fourth venue to bear the name "Madison Square Garden"; the first two (1879 and 1890) were located on Madison Square, on East 26th Street and Madison Avenue, with the third Madison Square Garden (1925) farther uptown at Eighth Avenue and 50th Street.

The Garden is used for professional ice hockey and basketball, as well as boxing, mixed martial arts, concerts, ice shows, circuses, professional wrestling and other forms of sports and entertainment. It is close to other midtown Manhattan landmarks, including the Empire State Building, Koreatown, and Macy's at Herald Square. It is home to the New York Rangers of the National Hockey League (NHL), the New York Knicks of the National Basketball Association (NBA), and was home to the New York Liberty of the Women's National Basketball Association (WNBA) from 1997 to 2017.

Originally called Madison Square Garden Center, the Garden opened on February 11, 1968, and is the oldest major sporting facility in the New York metropolitan area. It is the oldest arena in the NBA and the second oldest arena in the NHL. As of 2016, MSG is also the second-busiest music arena in the world in terms of ticket sales. Including two major renovations, its total construction cost was approximately $1.1 billion, and it has been ranked as one of the 10 most expensive stadium venues ever built. It is part of the Pennsylvania Plaza office and retail complex, named for the railway station. Several other operating entities related to the Garden share its name.

History

Previous Gardens
Madison Square is formed by the intersection of 5th Avenue and Broadway at 23rd Street in Manhattan. It was named after James Madison, fourth President of the United States.

Two venues called Madison Square Garden were located just northeast of the square, the original Garden from 1879 to 1890, and the second Garden from 1890 to 1925. The first, leased to P. T. Barnum, and was demolished in 1890 because of a leaky roof and dangerous balconies that had collapsed, resulting in deaths. The second was designed by noted architect Stanford White. The new building was built by a syndicate which included J. P. Morgan, Andrew Carnegie, P. T. Barnum, Darius Mills, James Stillman and W. W. Astor. White gave them a Beaux-Arts structure with a Moorish feel, including a minaret-like tower modeled after Giralda, the bell tower of the Cathedral of Seville – soaring 32 stories – the city's second-tallest building at the time – dominating Madison Square Park. It had a 1,200-seat theatre, a concert hall with a capacity of 1,500, the largest restaurant in the city, and a roof garden cabaret. The building cost $3 million. Madison Square Garden II was unsuccessful like the first Garden, and the New York Life Insurance Company, which held the mortgage on it, decided to tear it down in 1925 to make way for a new headquarters building, which would become the landmark Cass Gilbert-designed New York Life Building.

A third Madison Square Garden opened in a new location, on 8th Avenue between 49th and 50th Streets, from 1925 to 1968. Groundbreaking on the third Madison Square Garden took place on January 9, 1925. Designed by the noted theater architect Thomas W. Lamb, it was built at the cost of $4.75 million in 249 days by boxing promoter Tex Rickard; the arena was dubbed "The House That Tex Built."

Demolition commenced in 1968 after the opening of the current Garden, and was completed in early 1969. The site is now the location of One Worldwide Plaza.

Current Garden
In February 1959, former automobile manufacturer Graham-Paige purchased a 40% interest in the Madison Square Garden for $4 million and later gained control. In November 1960, Graham-Paige president Irving Mitchell Felt purchased from the Pennsylvania Railroad the rights to build at Penn Station. To build the new facility, the above-ground portions of the original Pennsylvania Station were torn down.

The new structure was one of the first of its kind to be built above the platforms of an active railroad station. It was an engineering feat constructed by Robert E. McKee of El Paso, Texas. Public outcry over the demolition of the Pennsylvania Station structure—an outstanding example of Beaux-Arts architecture—led to the creation of the New York City Landmarks Preservation Commission. The venue opened on February 11, 1968. Comparing the new and the old Penn Station, Yale architectural historian Vincent Scully wrote, "One entered the city like a god; one scuttles in now like a rat."

In 1972, Felt proposed moving the Knicks and Rangers to a then incomplete venue in the New Jersey Meadowlands, the Meadowlands Sports Complex. The Garden was also the home arena for the NY Raiders/NY Golden Blades of the World Hockey Association. The Meadowlands would eventually host its own NBA and NHL teams, the New Jersey Nets and the New Jersey Devils, respectively. The New York Giants and Jets of the National Football League (NFL) also relocated there. In 1977, the arena was sold to Gulf and Western Industries. Felt's efforts fueled controversy between the Garden and New York City over real estate taxes. The disagreement again flared in 1980 when the Garden again challenged its tax bill. The arena, since the 1980s, has since enjoyed tax-free status, under the condition that all Knicks and Rangers home games must be hosted at MSG, lest it lose this exemption. As such, when the Rangers have played neutral-site games—even those in New York City, such as the 2018 NHL Winter Classic, they have always been designated as the visiting team.

In 1984, the four streets immediately surrounding the Garden were designated as Joe Louis Plaza, in honor of boxer Joe Louis, who had made eight successful title defenses in the previous Madison Square Garden.

1991 renovation 
In April 1986, Gulf and Western announced that they would build a new Madison Square Garden a few blocks away on the site of present-day Hudson Yards. The plan would cost an estimated $150 million and included the demolition of the 1964 building to replace it with a new office tower development. After years of planning, Gulf and Western decided against building a new arena in favor of a renovation after estimated costs doubled throughout the process.

Garden owners spent $200 million in 1991 to renovate facilities and add 89 suites in place of hundreds of upper-tier seats. The project was designed by Ellerbe Becket. The renovation was criticized for perceived corporatization. Additionally, the renovation made bathrooms larger, expanded menus, added a new ventilation system, replaced all of the seats with new cushioned teal and violet seats, and refurbished both home teams' locker rooms.

In 2000, current MSG owner, James Dolan was quoted as saying that a new arena was being considered as the current building was starting to show its age.

In 2004–2005, Cablevision battled with the City of New York over the proposed West Side Stadium, which was cancelled. Cablevision then announced plans to raze the Garden, replace it with high-rise commercial buildings, and build a new Garden one block away at the site of the James Farley Post Office. Meanwhile, a new project to renovate and modernize the Garden completed phase one in time for the Rangers and Knicks' 2011–12 seasons, though the vice president of the Garden says he remains committed to the installation of an extension of Penn Station at the Farley Post Office site. While the Knicks and Rangers were not displaced, the New York Liberty played at the Prudential Center in Newark, New Jersey during the renovation.

Madison Square Garden is the last of the NBA and NHL arenas not to be named after a corporate sponsor.

2011–2013 renovation
Madison Square Garden's $1 billion second renovation took place mainly over three off-seasons. It was set to begin after the 2009–10 hockey/basketball seasons, but was delayed until after the 2010–11 seasons. Renovation was done in phases with the majority of the work done in the summer months to minimize disruptions to the NHL and NBA seasons. While the Rangers and Knicks were not displaced, the Liberty played their home games through the 2013 season at Prudential Center in Newark, New Jersey, during the renovation.

New features include a larger entrance with interactive kiosks, retail, climate-controlled space, and broadcast studio; larger concourses; new lighting and LED video systems with HDTV; new seating; two new pedestrian walkways suspended from the ceiling to allow fans to look directly down onto the games being played below; more dining options; and improved dressing rooms, locker rooms, green rooms, upgraded roof, and production offices. The lower bowl concourse, called the Madison Concourse, remains on the sixth floor. The upper bowl concourse was relocated to the eighth floor and it is known as the Garden Concourse. The seventh floor houses the new Madison Suites and the Madison Club. The upper bowl was built on top of these suites. The rebuilt concourses are wider than their predecessors, and include large windows that offer views of the city streets around the Garden.

Construction of the lower bowl (Phase 1) was completed for the 2011–12 NHL season and the 2011–12 NBA lockout-shortened season. An extended off-season for the Garden permitted some advanced work to begin on the new upper bowl, which was completed in time for the 2012–13 NBA season and the 2012–13 NHL lockout-shortened NHL season. This advance work included the West Balcony on the tenth floor, taking the place of sky-boxes, and new end-ice 300 level seating. The construction of the upper bowl along with the Madison Suites and the Madison Club (Phase 2) were completed for the 2012–13 NHL and NBA seasons. The construction of the new lobby known as Chase Square, along with the Chase Bridges and the new scoreboard (Phase 3) were completed for the 2013–14 NHL and NBA seasons.

Penn Station renovation controversy
Madison Square Garden is seen as an obstacle in the renovation and future expansion of Penn Station, which expanded in 2021 with the opening of Moynihan Train Hall at the James Farley Post Office, and some have proposed moving MSG to other sites in western Manhattan. On February 15, 2013, Manhattan Community Board 5 voted 36–0 against granting a renewal to MSG's operating permit in perpetuity and proposed a 10-year limit instead in order to build a new Penn Station where the arena is currently standing. Manhattan borough president Scott Stringer said, "Moving the arena is an important first step to improving Penn Station." The Madison Square Garden Company responded by saying that "[i]t is incongruous to think that M.S.G. would be considering moving."

In May 2013, four architecture firms – SHoP Architects, SOM, H3 Hardy Collaboration Architecture, and Diller Scofidio + Renfro – submitted proposals for a new Penn Station. SHoP Architects recommended moving Madison Square Garden to the Morgan Postal Facility a few blocks southwest, as well as removing 2 Penn Plaza and redeveloping other towers, and an extension of the High Line to Penn Station. Meanwhile, SOM proposed moving Madison Square Garden to the area just south of the James Farley Post Office, and redeveloping the area above Penn Station as a mixed-use development with commercial, residential, and recreational space. H3 Hardy Collaboration Architecture wanted to move the arena to a new pier west of Jacob K. Javits Convention Center, four blocks west of the current station and arena. Then, according to H3's plan, four skyscrapers would be built, one at each of the four corners of the new Penn Station superblock, with a roof garden on top of the station; the Farley Post Office would become an education center. Finally, Diller Scofidio + Renfro proposed a mixed-use development on the site, with spas, theaters, a cascading park, a pool, and restaurants; Madison Square Garden would be moved two blocks west, next to the post office. DS+F also proposed high-tech features in the station, such as train arrival and departure boards on the floor, and apps that would inform waiting passengers of ways to occupy their time until they board their trains. Madison Square Garden rejected the notion that it would be relocated, and called the plans "pie-in-the-sky".

In June 2013, the New York City Council Committee on Land Use voted unanimously to give the Garden a ten-year permit, at the end of which period the owners will either have to relocate or go back through the permission process. On July 24, the City Council voted to give the Garden a 10-year operating permit by a vote of 47–1. "This is the first step in finding a new home for Madison Square Garden and building a new Penn Station that is as great as New York and suitable for the 21st century," said City Council speaker Christine Quinn. "This is an opportunity to reimagine and redevelop Penn Station as a world-class transportation destination."

In October 2014, the Morgan facility was selected as the ideal area for Madison Square Garden to be moved, following the 2014 MAS Summit in New York City. More plans for the station were discussed. Then, in January 2016, New York Governor Andrew Cuomo announced a redevelopment plan for Penn Station that would involve the removal of The Theater at Madison Square Garden, but would otherwise leave the arena intact.

Events

Regular events

Sports
Madison Square Garden hosts approximately 320 events a year. It is the home to the New York Rangers of the National Hockey League, and the New York Knicks of the National Basketball Association. Before 2020, the New York Rangers, New York Knicks, and the Madison Square Garden arena itself were all owned by the Madison Square Garden Company. The MSG Company split into two entities in 2020, with the Garden arena and other non-sports assets spun off into Madison Square Garden Entertainment and the Rangers and Knicks remaining with the original company, renamed Madison Square Garden Sports. Both entities remain under the voting control of James Dolan and his family. The arena is also host to the Big East men's basketball tournament and was home to the finals of the National Invitation Tournament from the beginning of its existence up until 2022. It also hosts select home games for the St. John's Red Storm, representing St. John's University in men's (college basketball), and almost any other kind of indoor activity that draws large audiences, such as the Westminster Kennel Club Dog Show and the 2004 Republican National Convention.

The Garden was home of the NBA Draft and NIT Season Tip-Off, as well as the former New York City home of the Ringling Brothers and Barnum and Bailey Circus and Disney on Ice; all four events are now held at the Barclays Center in Brooklyn. It served the New York Cosmos for half of their home games during the 1983–84 NASL Indoor season.

Many of boxing's biggest fights were held at Madison Square Garden, including the Roberto Durán–Ken Buchanan affair, the first Muhammad Ali – Joe Frazier bout and the US debut of Anthony Joshua that ended in a huge upset when he was beaten by Andy Ruiz. Before promoters such as Don King and Bob Arum moved boxing to Las Vegas, Nevada, Madison Square Garden was considered the mecca of boxing. The original  ring, which was brought from the second and third generation of the Garden, was officially retired on September 19, 2007, and donated to the International Boxing Hall of Fame after 82 years of service. A  ring replaced it beginning on October 6 of that same year. The UFC has made Madison Square Garden in recent years and have put on some of the highest grossing PPV events in history.

Pro wrestling
Madison Square Garden has been considered the mecca for professional wrestling and the home of WWE (formerly WWF and WWWF). The Garden has hosted three WrestleMania events, including the first edition of the annual marquee event for WWE, as well as the 10th and 20th editions. It also hosted the Royal Rumble in 2000 and 2008; SummerSlam in 1988, 1991 and 1998; as well as Survivor Series in 1996, 2002 and 2011. Multiple episodes of WWE's weekly shows, Raw and SmackDown have been broadcast from the Arena as well.

New Japan Pro-Wrestling (NJPW) and Ring of Honor hosted their G1 Supercard supershow at the venue on April 6, 2019, which sold out in 19 minutes after the tickets went on sale. A year later it was announced that New Japan Pro-Wrestling would return to Madison Square Garden alone on August 22, 2020, for NJPW Wrestle Dynasty. In May 2020, NJPW announced that the Wrestle Dynasty show would be postponed to 2021 due to the COVID-19 pandemic.

Concerts

Madison Square Garden hosts more high-profile concert events than any other venue in New York City. It has been the venue for Michael Jackson's Bad World Tour in 1988, George Harrison's The Concert for Bangladesh, The Concert for New York City following the September 11 attacks, John Lennon's final concert appearance (during an Elton John concert on Thanksgiving Night, 1974) before his murder in 1980, and Elvis Presley, who gave four sold-out performances in 1972, his first and last ever in New York City. Parliament-Funkadelic headlined numerous sold-out shows in 1977 and 1978. Kiss, who were formed in the arena's city and three of whose members were city-born, did six shows during their second half of the 1970s main attraction peak or "heyday": four winter shows at the arena in 1977 (February 18 and December 14–16), and another two shows only this time in summer for a decade-ender in 1979 (July 24–25). Billy Joel, another city-born and fellow 1970's pop star, played his first Garden show on December 14, 1978. Led Zeppelin's three-night stand in July 1973 was recorded and released as both a film and album titled The Song Remains The Same. The Police played their final show of their reunion tour at the Garden in 2008.

In the summer of 2017, Phish held a 13 night series of concerts called "The Bakers' Dozen." During which the band played 237 unique songs, repeating none during the entire run. The Garden commemorated "The Bakers' Dozen" by adding a Phish themed banner to the rafters. With their first MSG show taking place on December 30, 1994, Phish has regularly played annual multi night runs, typically around New Year's Eve. As of 2023, Phish has performed 76 times at MSG. 

At one point, Elton John held the all-time record for the greatest number of appearances at the Garden with 64 shows. In a 2009 press release, John was quoted as saying "Madison Square Garden is my favorite venue in the whole world. I chose to have my 60th birthday concert there, because of all the incredible memories I've had playing the venue." A DVD recording was released as Elton 60—Live at Madison Square Garden.

Billy Joel, who holds the record for the greatest number of appearances at the Garden with 134 shows as of February 2023, stated that "Madison Square Garden is the center of the universe as far as I'm concerned. It has the best acoustics, the best audiences, the best reputation, and the best history of great artists who have played there. It is the iconic, holy temple of rock and roll for most touring acts and, being a New Yorker, it holds a special significance to me."

The Grateful Dead performed in the venue 53 times from 1979 to 1994, with the first show being held on September 7, 1979, and the last being on October 19, 1994. Their longest run being done in September 1991. Madonna performed at this venue a total of 31 concerts, the first two being during her 1985 Virgin Tour, on June 10 and 11, and the most recent being the two-nights stay during her Rebel Heart Tour on September 16 and 17, 2015. Bruce Springsteen has performed 47 concerts at this venue, many with the E Street Band, including a 10-night string of sold-out concerts out between June 12 and July 1, 2000, at the end of the E Street Reunion tour. Queen played their first concerts at the venue from 1977 to 1982. Bob Marley and the Wailers performed in the venue in 1978, 1979 and 1980 as part of Kaya Tour, Survival Tour and Uprising Tour respectively.

U2 performed at the arena 28 times: the first one was on April 1, 1985, during their Unforgettable Fire Tour, in front of a crowd of 19,000 people. The second and the third were on September 28 and 29, 1987, during their Joshua Tree Tour, in front of 39,510 people. The fourth was on March 20, 1992, during their Zoo TV Tour, in front of a crowd of 18,179 people. The fifth, sixth, seventh, eighth and ninth were on June 17 and 19 and October 24, 25 and 27, 2001, during their Elevation Tour, in front of 91,787 people. The 10th through 17th took place between May 21 and November 22, 2005, during their Vertigo Tour, in front of a total sold-out crowd of 149,004 people. The band performed eight performances at the arena in July 2015 as part of their Innocence + Experience Tour, and three performances in 2018 as part of their Experience + Innocence Tour.

The Who have headlined at the venue 32 times, including a four-night stand in 1974, a five-night stand in 1979, a six-night stand in 1996, and four-night stands in 2000 and 2002. They also performed at The Concert for New York City in 2001.

On March 10, 2020, a 50th-anniversary celebration of The Allman Brothers Band entitled 'The Brothers' took place featuring the five surviving members of the final Allman Brothers lineup and Chuck Leavell. Dickey Betts was invited to participate but his health precluded him from traveling. This was the final concert at the venue before the COVID-19 pandemic forced its closure. Live shows returned to The Garden when the Foo Fighters headlined a show there on June 20, 2021. The show was for a vaccinated audience only and was the first 100 percent capacity concert in a New York arena since the start of the pandemic.

Other events

It hosted the 1976 Democratic National Convention, 1980 Democratic National Convention, 1992 Democratic National Convention, and the 2004 Republican National Convention, and hosted the NFL Draft for many years (later held at Garden-leased Radio City Music Hall, now shared between cities of NFL franchises). The Jeopardy! Teen Tournament and several installments of Celebrity Jeopardy! were filmed at MSG in 1999, as well as several episodes of Wheel of Fortune in 1999 and 2013.

The New York Police Academy, Baruch College/CUNY and Yeshiva University also hold their annual graduation ceremonies at Madison Square Garden. It hosted the Grammy Awards in 1972, 1997, 2003, and 2018 (which are normally held in Los Angeles) as well as the Latin Grammy Awards of 2006.

The group, and Best in Show competitions of the Westminster Kennel Club Dog Show have been held at MSG every February from 1877 to 2020, which was MSG's longest continuous tenant although this was broken in 2021 as the Westminster Kennel Club announced that the event would be held outdoors for the first time due to the COVID-19 pandemic.

Notable firsts and significant events

The Garden hosted the Stanley Cup Finals and NBA Finals simultaneously on two occasions: in 1972 and 1994.

The Knicks clinched the 1970 NBA Finals at the arena in the seventh game, remembered best for Willis Reed's unexpected appearance after an injury. The Rangers would later end their 54-year championship drought by winning the 1994 Stanley Cup Finals on home ice. Finally, the 1999 NBA Finals was decided in the Garden, with the San Antonio Spurs defeating the Knicks in five games.

MSG has hosted the following All-Star Games:
 NHL All-Star Game: 1973, 1994
 NBA All-Star Game: 1998, 2015
 WNBA All-Star Game: 1999, 2003, 2006
 All American Karate Championships held in 1968 & 1969 won by Chuck Norris 1970 was won by Mitchell Bobrow.
 UFC held its first event in New York City, UFC 205: Alvarez vs. McGregor, at Madison Square Garden on November 12, 2016. This was the first event the organization held after New York State lifted the ban on mixed martial arts.

Recognition given by Madison Square Garden

Madison Square Garden Gold Ticket Award

In 1977, Madison Square Garden announced Gold Ticket Awards would be given to performers who had brought in more than 100,000 unit ticket sales to the venue. Since the arena's seating capacity is about 20,000, this would require a minimum of five sold-out shows. Performers who were eligible for the award at the time of its inauguration included Chicago, John Denver, Peter Frampton, the Rolling Stones, the Jackson 5, Elton John, Led Zeppelin, Sly Stone, Jethro Tull, The Who, and Yes. Graeme Edge, who received his award in 1981 as a member of The Moody Blues, said he found his gold ticket to be an interesting piece of memorabilia because he could use it to attend any event at the Garden. Many other performers have received a Gold Ticket Award since 1977.

Madison Square Garden Platinum Ticket Award
Madison Square Garden also gave Platinum Ticket Awards to performers who sold over 250,000 tickets to their shows throughout the years. Winners of the Platinum Ticket Awards include: the Rolling Stones (1981), Elton John (1982), Yes (1984), Billy Joel (1984), the Grateful Dead (1987), and Madonna (2004).

Madison Square Garden Hall of Fame
The Madison Square Garden Hall of Fame honors those who have demonstrated excellence in their fields at the Garden. Most of the inductees have been sports figures, however, some performers have been inducted as well. Elton John was reported to be the first non-sports figure inducted into the MSG Hall of Fame in 1977 for "record attendance of 140,000" in June of that year. For their accomplishment of "13 sell-out concerts" at the venue, the Rolling Stones were inducted into the MSG Hall of Fame in 1984, along with nine sports figures icons, bringing the hall's membership to 107.

Madison Square Garden Walk of Fame

The walkway leading to the arena of Madison Square Garden was designated as the "Walk of Fame" in 1992. It was established "to recognize athletes, artists, announcers and coaches for their extraordinary achievements and memorable performances at the venue." Each inductee is commemorated with a plaque that lists the performance category in which his or her contributions have been made.
Twenty-five athletes were inducted into the MSG Walk of Fame at its inaugural ceremony in 1992, a black-tie dinner to raise money to fight multiple sclerosis. 
Elton John was the first entertainer to be inducted into the MSG Walk of Fame in 1992. 
Billy Joel was inducted at a date after Elton John, 
and the Rolling Stones were inducted in 1998. 
In 2015, the Grateful Dead were inducted into the MSG Walk of Fame along with at least three sports-related figures.

Seating
Seating in Madison Square Garden was initially arranged in six ascending levels, each with its own color. The first level, which was available only for basketball games, boxing and concerts, and not for hockey games and ice shows, was known as the "Rotunda" ("ringside" for boxing and "courtside" for basketball), had beige seats, and bore section numbers of 29 and lower (the lowest number varying with the different venues, in some cases with the very lowest sections denoted by letters rather than numbers). Next above this was the "Orchestra" (red) seating, sections 31 through 97, followed by the 100-level "First Promenade" (orange) and 200-level "Second Promenade"(yellow), the 300-level (green) "First Balcony", and the 400-level (blue) "Second Balcony." The rainbow-colored seats were replaced with fuchsia and teal seats during the 1990s renovation (in part because the blue seats had acquired an unsavory reputation, especially during games in which the New York Rangers hosted their cross-town rivals, the New York Islanders) which installed the 10th-floor sky-boxes around the entire arena and the 9th-floor sky-boxes on the 7th avenue end of the arena, taking out 400-level seating on the 7th Avenue end in the process.

Because all of the seats, except the 400 level, were in one monolithic grandstand, horizontal distance from the arena floor was significant from the ends of the arena. Also, the rows rose much more gradually than other North American arenas, which caused impaired sightlines, especially when sitting behind tall spectators or one of the concourses. This arrangement, however, created an advantage over newer arenas in that seats had a significantly lower vertical distance from the arena floor.

As part of the 2011–2013 renovation, the club sections, 100-level and 200-level have been combined to make a new 100-level lower bowl. The 300-level and 400-level were combined and raised  closer, forming a new 200-level upper bowl. All skyboxes but those on the 7th Avenue end were removed and replaced with balcony seating (8th Avenue) and Chase Bridge Seating (31st Street and 33rd Street). The sky-boxes on the 9th floor were remodeled and are now called the Signature Suites. The sky-boxes on the 7th Avenue end of the 10th Floor are now known as the Lounges. One small section of the 400-level remains near the west end of the arena and features blue seats. The media booths have been relocated to the 31st Street Chase Bridge.

Capacity

Hulu Theater

The Hulu Theater at Madison Square Garden seats between 2,000 and 5,600 for concerts and can also be used for meetings, stage shows, and graduation ceremonies. It was the home of the NFL Draft until 2005, when it moved to the Jacob K. Javits Convention Center after MSG management opposed a new stadium for the New York Jets. It also hosted the NBA Draft from 2001 to 2010. The theater also occasionally hosts boxing matches.

The fall 1999 Jeopardy! Teen Tournament as well as a Celebrity Jeopardy! competitions were held at the theater. Wheel of Fortune taped at the theater twice in 1999 and 2013. In 2004, it was the venue of the Survivor: All-Stars finale. The theatre has a relatively low  ceiling at stage level and all of its seating except for boxes on the two side walls is on one level slanted back from the stage. There is an  lobby at the theater.

Accessibility and transportation

Madison Square Garden sits directly atop a major transportation hub in Pennsylvania Station, featuring access to commuter rail service from the Long Island Rail Road and New Jersey Transit, as well as Amtrak. The Garden is also accessible via the New York City Subway.

See also
 Madison Square Garden Bowl, a former outdoor boxing venue in Queens operated by the Garden company
 List of NCAA Division I basketball arenas

References

Notes

Other sources
 
 
 
 
 
 
 "A Garden Built For Tomorrow," Sports Illustrated, January 2, 1967.
 Madison Square Garden under construction from the Hagley Digital Archives

External links

 
 The Madison Square Garden Company

 
Indoor arenas in New York City
Music venues in Manhattan
Sports venues in Manhattan
Athletics (track and field) venues in New York City
Basketball venues in New York City
Boxing venues in New York City
College basketball venues in the United States
College ice hockey venues in the United States
College wrestling venues in the United States
Convention centers in New York City
Eighth Avenue (Manhattan)
Former Viacom subsidiaries
Grammy Award venues
1998 Goodwill Games venues
Gymnastics venues in New York City
Indoor ice hockey venues in New York City
Indoor lacrosse venues in the United States
Indoor soccer venues in New York (state)
Indoor track and field venues in New York (state)
Madison Square Garden Sports
Manhattan Jaspers basketball
Mixed martial arts venues in New York (state)
National Basketball Association venues
National Hockey League venues
New York Knicks venues
New York Liberty venues
North American Soccer League (1968–1984) indoor venues
Pennsylvania Plaza
Round buildings
Sports venues completed in 1968
St. John's Red Storm basketball venues
World Hockey Association venues
Wrestling venues in New York City
WWE
1968 establishments in New York City
Tourist attractions in Manhattan
Esports venues in New York (state)
Gulf and Western Industries
New York Rangers